Itatí Guadalupe Cantoral Zucchi (born May 13, 1975) is a Mexican actress, singer, dancer, and producer. She is best known for her roles as Soraya Montenegro in María la del Barrio (1995) and  Alejandra Álvarez del Castillo Fernández "La Licenciada" in Hasta que el dinero nos separe (2009), both telenovelas produced by Televisa.

Early life and education
Cantoral was born in Mexico City, Mexico. She is the daughter of Mexican composer and songwriter, Roberto Cantoral,  and Argentine actress of Italian descent, Itatí Zucchi. Cantoral has three brothers Carlos, Roberto & also actor and singer José Cantoral. A child actress, at 13, Cantoral  was accepted into the Televisa actors' academy, Centro de Educación Artística, and made her television debut in the series La telaraña in 1986. She later acted in the telenovela Muchachitas in 1991.

Career
In 1993, Cantoral appeared in Dos mujeres, un camino with Erik Estrada, Laura León, Bibi Gaytán, Lorena Herrera, Selena Quintanilla, Jorge Salinas, and members of Grupo Bronco. This production exposed her to wider audiences in Mexico and Latin America. She took the role of the villain Soraya Montenegro in María la del Barrio from 1995 to 1996, alongside Thalía and Fernando Colunga. In 1996 and 1997 she appeared in Tú y yo, with Maribel Guardia and Joan Sebastian; and in Salud, dinero y amor, the sequel to Mexican telenovela El premio mayor.

In 2001, Cantoral played the antagonic role of Raquel Villavicencio in Sin Pecado Concebido, another Televisa production starring Angelica Rivera and Carlos Ponce. She starred in the Brazilian-American co-production Vale todo in 2002; and in 2003, Telemundo's El alma herida, as a teenage girl who crosses the Mexican–American border to find her long-lost mother. In 2004, she was Sally Bowles in Mexico City's Teatro Insurgentes production of Cabaret, and in 2006, she starred with Francisco Gattorno in the Telemundo production of Julio Jimenez's La Viuda de Blanco.

In 2009–2010, she played the character Alejandra Alvarez Del Castilo in Televisa's hit telenovela Hasta que el dinero nos separe with actor and singer Pedro Fernández, for which she won Best Actress at the Premios TVyNovelas, where the telenovela also won the main category; while the actors won Best Couple of the Year at the show.

Cantoral protagonized many famous plays in Mexican theatre, such as Aventurera, Sweet Charity, Mame the Musical and many more.

In 2018, she starred as Mexican actress Silvia Pinal in the biographical television series Silvia Pinal, Frente a Ti, for which she was nominated as Best Actress in a TV series for the Premios TVyNovelas.

On November 18, 2015, Cantoral was named Mr. Amigo, which is an association in Brownsville, Texas that honors a Mexican citizen each year to promote international friendship and good will between the U.S. and Mexico. Itatí is the second member of the Cantoral family to be awarded Mr. Amigo after her father, Roberto Cantoral, was awarded in 1981.

As a singer, Cantoral has released two albums, one of them being Itatí Canta a Roberto Cantoral, which was produced by her late father Roberto Cantoral. In 2018, she was part of the tribute album to her father "Roberto Cantoral: Siempre Vivo" with the song "Me Esta Gustando".

Filmography

Film

Television

Awards and nominations

TVyNovelas Awards

Premios People en Español

Festival Mercado TV-Fiction International Awards

Association of Theatre Journalists Awards

Other awards

 Medal Omecihuatl 2011 Awarded by Inmujeres DF
 Part of  "Los 50 más bellos"  by magazine People en Español (2011, 2015)
 Queen of Voceadores (2010)
 Queen of Veracruz television
 Premio Palmas de oro (Best Villain)
 Jealous of the popularity
 Premio Bravo
 Premio ACE of New York
 El Sol de oro
 Premio Fama  New York (2002)
Queen of Mariachi (2015)
Mr. Amigo (Nov. 18, 2015)

References

External links

1975 births
Living people
Mexican telenovela actresses
Mexican television actresses
Mexican film actresses
Mexican stage actresses
20th-century Mexican actresses
21st-century Mexican actresses
Actresses from Mexico City
Singers from Mexico City
Mexican people of Argentine descent
Mexican people of Italian descent
People from Mexico City
21st-century Mexican singers
21st-century Mexican women singers
Mexican people of Spanish descent
Mexican people of French descent